Julien Caussé (also given as Cadet-Julien Caussé, Cadet Julien Caussé and Julien Cadet Caussé, birth name Jules Caussé) (1869–after 1929) was a prolific French sculptor during the art nouveau period of the late 19th and early 20th centuries who specialized in small figures.

Background and career 
Jules Caussé was born in Bourges, France on January 27, 1869. He was the son of the sculptor Auguste Caussé and was active as sculptor from 1890 until his death. He studied under Alexandre Falguière and his pieces were exhibited at the Salon des Artistes Français from 1888 to 1912, obtaining honorable mentions in 1882 and 1900 and a third class medal in 1893. He also took part in the Exposition Universelle of 1900.

In his career he produced hundreds of works of art in the Art Nouveau style. His work included solid bronze sculptures and mixed media pieces that included bronze sculptures with glass, wire and stone enhancements. His mixed media work also included sculptures that were designed for more practical purposes, such as lamps and clocks. While the subjects of his works were mainly women, both nude and dressed, he is also known to have produced a limited number of pieces based on male subjects. He is listed in Benezit Dictionary of Artists and his sculpture "La Musique" is featured in volume four of the Berman Book of Bronzes.
He was still active in 1929, living in the 14th arrondissement of Paris.

Selected works 
 La Fée des Glaces  
 Nymphéa  
 Brise de Mai  
 Tischlampe Muse  
 Stehendes Mädchen mit Flöte
 Fin de Journée

References

Julien Caussé - An Art Nouveau Sculpture, France 1900, entitled "Pensee".

1869 births
Art Nouveau sculptors
Artists from Bourges
20th-century French sculptors
19th-century French sculptors
French male sculptors
19th-century French male artists
Year of death missing